Jogendranath Mandal (Bengali: যোগেন্দ্রনাথ মন্ডল; 29 January 1904 – 5 October 1968), was one of the founding fathers of modern state of Pakistan, and legislator serving as country's first minister of law and labour, and also was second minister of Commonwealth and Kashmir affairs. In the cabinet of Interim Government of India, He got the law portfolio before. As a leader of the Scheduled Castes (Dalits), Jogendranath Mandal campaigned against the division of Bengal in 1947, believing that the divided Bengal would mean that Dalits would be at the mercy of the Muslim majority in East Bengal (Pakistan), and at the thraldom of majority caste-Hindus in West Bengal (India). In the end, he decided to maintain his base in East Pakistan, hoping that the Dalits would be benefited from it and joined the first cabinet in Pakistan as the Minister of Law and Labour. He migrated to India a few years after partition after submitting his resignation to Liaquat Ali Khan, the then Prime Minister of Pakistan, citing the anti-Dalits bias of Pakistani administration.

Early life

Jogendra Nath Mandal was born in the Barisal district of what was then Bengal Presidency, British India (later East Bengal and East Pakistan, presently Bangladesh) on 29 January 1904. He belonged to the Namasudra Community. Jogendra Nath Mandal was a diligent student since his nascent years, and with his resilient assiduousness to study, he passed his initial education in the First Class; then after graduating in 1929, took admission in law. But after completion of his law degree in 1934, Jogendra Nath Mandal decided not to take up law practice or a job. Instead, he commenced his vociferous retaliation against the unjust and oppressive societal structure which had hitherto humiliated his community, and decided to dedicate his whole life for the betterment of the oppresseds and society as a whole.

Political career in India (1937-1947)

Mandal began his political career as an independent candidate in the Indian provincial assembly elections of 1937. He contested Bakharganj North East Rural constituency for a seat in the Bengal legislative assembly and defeated Saral Kumar Dutta, the president of the district committee of the Indian National Congress (INC) and nephew of the Swadeshi leader, Ashwini Kumar Dutta.

Mandal was considerably influenced around this time by both Subhas Chandra Bose and Sarat Chandra Bose. When the former was expelled from the INC in 1940, Mandal became involved with the Muslim League (ML), which was the only other significant national party, and became a minister in the cabinet of the ML chief minister, Huseyn Shaheed Suhrawardy.

Mandal was a follower of Dr. Babasaheb Ambedkar, the father of the Indian Constitution. It was also around this time that Mandal and B. R. Ambedkar established the Bengal branch of the Scheduled Castes Federation, which itself aspired to political power. Mandal played a vital role for Ambedkar’s election to the Constituent Assembly from Bengal, when Ambedkar failed to secure a seat from Bombay in 1946. Mandal played a significant part in the framing of Constitution of India as well as  Ambedkar consulted and sought his advice through letters on matters pertaining to the framing of the Constitution.

While the Namasudra community was being courted by the Hindu Mahasabha, and politics in the province was dominated by the oppressed Dalit and Muslim people, Mandal saw a distinction between communal affairs and political disputes involving the INC and ML. When rioting broke out in 1946, he traveled around East Bengal to urge Dalit people not to participate in violence against Muslims, as Muslims were perceived to have been as oppressed by the upper caste Hindus as the Dalits were. He argued that the Dalits would be better off with the Muslims than with the high caste Hindus; thus, he supported ML.

When the Muslim League joined the Interim Government of India in October 1946, Jinnah nominated Mandal as one of the League's five representatives. King George VI duly appointed Mandal to the body, where he took over the law portfolio.

Political career in Pakistan (1947-1950)

Mandal was one of the 96 founding fathers of Pakistan, as he supported the ML. At their inaugural session, days before the 15 August 1947 partition of India, they elected him their temporary chairman. When Jinnah was to be sworn in as the first Governor General of Pakistan, he is said to have asked Mandal to preside over the session. He held immense faith in Mandal for his vision and righteousness. He was appointed Pakistan's first Minister for Law and Labour. But Mandal’s status did not last long because of  continuous suppression under a Muslim-majority bureaucracy. The situation further worsened after Jinnah’s death in September 1948. When Muslim rioters with the support of the police committed atrocities against his constituents, the Dalits, he protested. That caused strife between him and the Pakistani prime minister, Liaquat Ali Khan.

Returning to India (1950)

In 1950, Mandal had to return to India due to an arrest warrant against him in Pakistan, submitting his resignation to Liaquat Ali Khan, the then Prime Minister of Pakistan, citing inaction of the Pakistani administration against the rioters who committed atrocities against his people. He mentioned incidents related to social injustice and biased attitude towards non-Muslim minorities in his resignation letter. However he became a political untouchable after returning to India; still he continued his work to rehabilitate Hindu refugees from Bangladesh who were fast filling up West Bengal. He died on 5 October 1968 in Bongaon, North 24 Parganas.

Bibliography

References

Further reading

External links

 University of Southampton archives
 SACW

1904 births
1968 deaths
People from Barisal District
Bengali Hindus
First Pakistani Cabinet
All India Muslim League members
Labour ministers of Pakistan
Law Ministers of Pakistan
Leaders of the Pakistan Movement
Pakistani emigrants to India
Indian Hindus
Pakistan Movement activists from Bengal
Pakistani MNAs 1947–1954
Members of the Council of the Governor General of India
Bengal MLAs 1937–1945
Members of the Constituent Assembly of Pakistan